"I Can't Describe (The Way I Feel)" is a song by American recording artist Jennifer Hudson, released worldwide on September 24, 2013 as the lead single from her third studio album, JHUD (2014). The song, (with virtually zero elemental changes) was originally intended to be recorded by American artist Miley Cyrus, during sessions for her album, Bangerz, with the rap verse performed by American rapper Tyler, The Creator. However, the track was not finalized, and approved on the album. The official release was instead released by Hudson, with the rap verse performed by American rapper T.I. The song, which was produced by American musician Pharrell Williams; Musically, is an uptempo 1970s- and 1980s-inspired dance ballad that incorporates elements of Chaka Khan's music and is reminiscent of Evelyn King's songs "I'm in Love" and "Love Come Down".

Music video
The music video for "I Can't Describe (The Way I Feel)" was released on January 23, 2014. It was directed by Anthony Mandler.

Charts

References

External links
 

2010s ballads
2013 singles
2013 songs
Contemporary R&B ballads
Jennifer Hudson songs
Music videos directed by Anthony Mandler
Pop ballads
Song recordings produced by Pharrell Williams
Songs written by Pharrell Williams
Songs written by T.I.
T.I. songs